Hebert House may refer to:

in the United States (by state then town)
Hebert House (Brusly, Louisiana), listed on the National Register of Historic Places (NRHP) in West Baton Rouge Parish
Hebert House (Lake Arthur, Louisiana), listed on the NRHP in Cameron Parish
Louis Hebert House, Davenport, Iowa, listed on the NRHP in Scott County